GEN Corporation of Japan developed a personal helicopter named the GEN H-4, but production was deferred pending large enough orders to make the aircraft economical.

The company also developed the GEN 125, a very small , twin-cylinder, two-stroke aircraft engine to power the H-4. The engine weighs  and four are used in the H-4 design to provide redundancy.

The company does not have any fixed location, but has carried out its development work in borrowed facilities.

The company name translates as "fountain of wisdom".

Notes

External links
 GEN Corp official site (English)
 GEN Corp official site (Japanese)
 GEN H-4 flight video

Helicopter manufacturers of Japan
Japanese brands
Companies based in Nagano Prefecture